Pazdírek is a masculine Czech surname, its feminine counterpart is Pazdírkova. Notable people with the surname include:

Pavel Pazdírek (born 1937), Czech swimmer
Zdeněk Pazdírek (born 1953), Czech figure skater 

Czech-language surnames